The 2023 Panthers Wrocław season is the third season of the Panthers Wrocław team in the European League of Football.

Preseason
After the change in the front office in form of Jakub Samel, former head coach of the team and now director of sport, the franchise announced Dave Christensen as the new head coach for the new 2023 season. In preparation for the upcoming matches, the organization held a tryout at their olympic stadium. With the signings of Nik Rango and Branton Martin, national champion of the NCAA Division III in the 2021 Stagg Bowl with the Mary Hardin–Baylor Crusaders, the Panthers signed new key-players after departures of former players.

Regular season

Standings

Roster

Staff

Notes

References

Panthers Wrocław
Panthers Wrocław
Panthers Wrocław